The Apache Nugget Casino is located 15 miles north of Cuba, New Mexico, at the junctions of highway 550 and highway 537. The casino is operated by the Apache Nugget Corporation (ANC) which oversees all gaming activity for the Jicarilla Apache Nation. ANC is a for-profit Federally Chartered Section 17 Corporation owned by the Jicarilla Apache Nation. It is located in Dulce, New Mexico, the headquarters for the Nation. ANC has been in existence since 2003.

ANC's casino property the Apache Nugget Casino opened on August 6, 2004. The Apache Nugget Casino has 227 slot machines. In addition, it offers a small dining facility, gift/smoke shop, and a player's club.

External links 

Native American casinos
Casinos in New Mexico
Buildings and structures in Sandoval County, New Mexico
Tourist attractions in Sandoval County, New Mexico
2004 establishments in New Mexico
Jicarilla Apache
Casinos completed in 2004